"Murder to Excellence" is a song by American rappers Kanye West and Jay-Z, from their collaborative album Watch the Throne (2011). It samples LA LA LA, an original song written and produced by Romanian-American duo Indiggo Twins, inspired by Romanian folklore.The voices in the song are from Moldavian singers "Surorile Osoianu".   The song features additional vocals from Kid Cudi. The song was nominated for Impact Track at the 2012 Bet Hip Hop Awards. An edited version of the song featured in the trailer for 2022 film Black Adam.<ref>{{cite web |title=JAY-Z & Kanye's 'Murder To Excellence Soundtracks Black Adam |url=https://hiphopdx.com/news/id.70868/title.jay-z-kanyes-murder-to-excellence-puts-the-black-in-black-adam-trailer |website=HipHopDX |archive-url=https://web.archive.org/web/20220609054704/https://hiphopdx.com/news/id.70868/title.jay-z-kanyes-murder-to-excellence-puts-the-black-in-black-adam-trailer |archive-date=9 June 2022 |date=8 June 2022 |url-status=live}}</ref>

Composition
"Murder to Excellence" contains portions of "Celie Shaves Mr./Scarification" written by Quincy Jones and Harvey Mason, Jr., as performed by Quincy Jones. Samples of Indiggo Twins' original composition LA LA LA are contained in the song. Kanye and Jay show consciousness with the song addressing black-on black murder and black excellence with energy from both of them.

In an interview with Revolt, producer S1 revealed "Murder to Excellence" was originally two separate songs, that were later merged:
"These were two separate songs, which is crazy. So Swizz Beatz did the first half and the name of that song was actually, "Black on Black Murder." And then the second half that I did was actually called, "Black Excellence." I remember this like it was yesterday and we were all in the studio together and Kanye is playing both of these songs and he plays the Swizz Beatz song first, and then my version. We’re in the studio wilding out, listening to it and jumping around, and then he was like, "Yo what if we merge these two together?" So the engineer did it in the session and I remember us playing it and that transition happened the way it immediately went into the other song and we were just going crazy in the studio, like this is it. So they merged the titles, "Let's just call it "Murder to Excellence." The transition was so powerful because it flowed so smooth and it sounded, with the samples that Swizz and I chose they were very familiar but different, so it just blended so well".

Recording
S1 revealed that the song was in the second batch of beats that he sent to West and that he focused on beefing up the drums to create a true hip hop sound. Working with Kanye and Jay on the track alongside fellow album songs "Welcome to the Jungle" and "Who Gon Stop Me" was described by producer and additional vocalist Swizz Beatz as: "like being in the studio with Quincy Jones and Michael Jackson at the same time".

Critical reception
Tom Breihan of Pitchfork cited the subject matter of "black-on-black crime and the scarcity of people of color at society's highest seats" as an example on Watch the Throne of "how often Jay and Kanye address matters beyond their bank accounts". Brian Josephs of Complex'' expressed his opinion of Kanye and Jay's rapping: "They were stunting for a higher purpose."

"Murder to Excellence" earned a nomination for Impact Track at the 2012 Bet Hip Hop Awards, and ultimately lost to "Daughters" by Nas.

References

2011 songs
Experimental music songs
Jay-Z songs
Kanye West songs
Song recordings produced by Swizz Beatz
Song recordings produced by Symbolyc One
Songs about death
Songs written by Harvey Mason Jr.
Songs written by Jay-Z
Songs written by Kanye West
Songs written by Kid Cudi
Songs written by Quincy Jones
Songs written by Swizz Beatz
Songs written by Symbolyc One